Peter Brett Cullen (born August 26, 1956) is an American actor. He is best known for his roles as Dan Fixx in Falcon Crest (1986-1988), Sam Cain in The Young Riders (1989-1990), Governor Ray Sullivan in The West Wing (2005-2006), Goodwin Stanhope in Lost (2005-2008), Mark Keeler in Make It or Break It (2009-2012), and Michael Stappord in Devious Maids (2013-2015).

Early life
Cullen was born August 26, 1956, in Houston, Texas, the son of Catherine and Lucien Hugh Cullen, an oil industry executive and part of one of the most famous and wealthiest oil families in the oil-rich history of Texas. He graduated from Madison High School in Houston in 1974, subsequently attending the University of Houston from which he graduated in 1979. His alma mater awarded him a Distinguished Alumni Award in April 2012.

Cullen has given great credit to his highly acclaimed acting mentor and University of Houston professor, Cecil Pickett, who also mentored such Houston-born actors as Dennis Quaid, Randy Quaid, and Brent Spiner.  Cullen and Dennis Quaid's close friendship, which continues to this day, dates back to the 1970s; it is Cullen who introduced Dennis Quaid to his former wife, Kimberly Buffington, at a dinner in Austin, Texas.

Career
Cullen played Dan Fixx in the 1980s CBS drama Falcon Crest for two seasons (1986–88) and Sam Cain in the ABC western series The Young Riders for one season (1989–90). In 1980, he appeared as the second Gideon Chisholm in the last nine episodes of the CBS western miniseries The Chisholms. In the four earlier episodes, the Gideon Chisholm role was played by Brian Kerwin. Cullen was the lead actor as Ned Logan in the short-lived Legacy, which lasted for just one season (1998–99). On the series The West Wing Cullen played Ray Sullivan, a fictional former U.S. attorney, state attorney general, and governor of West Virginia and the Republican nominee for vice president.

His guest appearances on TV include: The Incredible Hulk, Tales from the Crypt, M*A*S*H,  V, Matlock, Star Trek: Deep Space Nine, Ally McBeal, Walker, Texas Ranger, Once and Again, Without a Trace, Cold Case, The Mountain, Monk, CSI: Miami, NCIS, Desperate Housewives, Pepper Dennis, Criminal Minds, Lost, Ghost Whisperer,  Private Practice, Ugly Betty, and Friday Night Lights. In 2009, he had a recurring role in the ABC Family television series Make It or Break It.

He played one of the CAPCOMs in Apollo 13 and real-life astronaut David Scott in the HBO miniseries From the Earth to the Moon.

Later work
In 1994, Cullen played a small role in Kevin Costner's Wyatt Earp. Subsequent film roles included Jamie Johnson in Something to Talk About, aspiring composer/hired escort Bryan in The Hired Heart 1997, the spoiled quarterback Eddie Martel in The Replacements (2000), Charlie Martin in the TV film version of On Golden Pond, Nancy's father Carson Drew in the TV film Nancy Drew, and Barton Blaze (father of Johnny Blaze / Ghost Rider) in the 2007 film Ghost Rider.

In 2011, he played stepfather to Selena Gomez's character in the romantic comedy Monte Carlo, and in 2012, appeared as a congressman in the Batman film The Dark Knight Rises. He also played Tom Eckert, father of protagonists Jed and Matt, in the remake of Red Dawn (a role played in the original 1984 film by Harry Dean Stanton).

Cullen has found steady work in numerous television roles for many years. In addition to guest-starring roles in dozens of series, in 1983 he played Bob Cleary in the miniseries The Thorn Birds. In 1997, he was cast as Adam in a three-episode story arc on Suddenly Susan called "Love and Divorce American Style". The following year, he played love interest Luke Barton in the short-lived series The Simple Life opposite Judith Light. Later in 1998, the UPN television network gave him the starring role of family patriarch Ned Logan in the post-Civil War drama Legacy, which lasted 18 episodes before cancellation.

After 2000, he played small recurring roles in ABC's Once and Again, the low-rated series The Mountain, and as a detective in two episodes of Desperate Housewives. Cullen was awarded a meatier part on The West Wing in 2005–06, when he played West Virginia governor and vice presidential candidate Ray Sullivan. Later in 2006, he played a recurring role on Pepper Dennis, which was cancelled after its first season as well. He played a short-lived love interest of Vanessa Williams' Wilhelmina Slater on Ugly Betty in early 2007, and followed that up with a story arc as dad Walt Riggins on Friday Night Lights. Although his recurring roles never lasted more than a few episodes, Cullen made the most of parts in the ongoing series Lost, Damages, and The Gates between 2007–10.

From 2011–16, Cullen played the flashback character Nathan Ingram on the hit series Person of Interest. He also plays Mark Keeler, father of Olympic gymnast hopefuls Payson and Becca Keeler, on the ABC Family series Make It or Break It.

On February 8, 2011, Cullen was named the official spokesman for Houston Works which helps Houston residents with job training and placement, scholarships, consulting, technical initiatives focusing on science, technology, engineering and mathematics and summer job programs along with Youth Summits.

In 2013, Cullen was cast in the television series Devious Maids, and in 2014 Cullen had recurring roles on the television series Revenge, Criminal Minds, and Under the Dome. He also starred in the film The Last Rescue.

In 2019, Cullen played Thomas Wayne in the film Joker.

Filmography

Film

Television

References

External links 

1956 births
Living people
20th-century American male actors
21st-century American male actors
American male film actors
American male television actors
Male actors from Houston
People from Texas
University of Houston alumni